Egius is a genus of lady beetles in the family Coccinellidae containing one species, E. platycephalus.

References

Further reading

 
 

Coccinellidae
Coccinellidae genera
Monotypic Cucujiformia genera
Articles created by Qbugbot